COBRA (backronym for COmmando Battalion for Resolute Action) is a special operation unit of the Central Reserve Police Force (CRPF) of India proficient in guerrilla tactics and jungle warfare. Originally established to counter the Naxalite movement, CoBRA is deployed to address insurgent groups engaging in asymmetrical warfare. Numbering ten battalions as of 2011, CoBRA is considered to be one of the most experienced and successful law enforcement units in the country.

Background
In 2009, the MHA approved the raising of 10 CoBRA (Commando Battalion for Resolute Action) to meet the challenges posed by the Naxal rebels. The unit was initially raised to counter the Naxal insurgents in the Red Corridor. The regiment initially started off with 2 battalions, in 2009, followed by the raising of another 8 battalions in 2 years.

CoBRA Battalions are trained to conduct operations against insurgents in all manners of rugged terrain. The highly efficient personnel are chosen from the CRPF and are conditioned with rigorous physical endurance, and taught the planning and execution of operations, GPS and map reading, gathering of intelligence, and Fast-Roping amongst other activities. The highly efficient personnel are trained and specialized in various fields including but not limited to guerrilla warfare, explosive tracking and bomb disposal, field engineering, survival, and jungle warfare.

Special intelligence courses have been conducted by premier intelligence agencies to train troops in intelligence gathering. To maintain the uniformity of standards and the evolution of a unique ethos as well as training of troops. A dedicated CoBRA school of jungle warfare & tactics is in the works.

The founder of CoBRA, DIG K.V. Madhusudhanan, spoke about the CoBRA's unit's rules of engagement in an interview. "The Maoist menace is a grievance-driven movement and ideology-driven insurgency. Hence, CoBRA would require new tactical doctrines, skills and resources. While the Maoist struggle is total—no time limit or fixed geographical target—CoBRA had to operate under limitations of law. There were no drawn lines of conflict, and CoBRA had to account for every person apprehended, injured or killed. The extremists have no such liabilities."

Since its inception, the unit has been successful in the taking down of 61 Naxals, and the apprehension of 886 more. They have also recovered vast amounts of ammunition dumps, along with arms and explosives. The CoBRA personnel's efforts have also been acknowledged with more than 200 commendation disc(s) from the DG CRPF. The valour and gallant actions of CoBRA has been recognised and the unit has been decorated with multiple Gallantry medals including -

 1 Kirti Chakra
 8 Shaurya Chakra
 6 PPMG
 250 PMG
 189 Parakram Padak
 6 Jeevan Raksha Padak
 13578 Antarik Suraksha Padak
 3339 DG Commendation Disc

1986 was the year when No. 88 Mahila Battalion, CRPF was raised, earning the distinction of being the first all-women battalion in the world. In 2021, 34 personnel from the hallowed ranks of the CRPF, to form an all-women CoBRA battalion.

Bases

Firearms and equipment

CoBRA is a well-equipped Central Armed Police unit in the country, set up with a budget of 293 billion from the Central government.

Small arms
 INSAS rifle
 FN FAL
 Excalibur assault rifle
 AKM assault rifle
 X-95 assault rifle
 9mm 1A Auto Pistol
 Glock pistol
 Heckler & Koch MP5 submachine gun
 Carl Gustav recoilless rifle
 Dragunov SVD sniper rifle
 84mm CGRL
 Steyr SSG 69
 Heckler & Koch MSG-90 sniper rifle.
 40×46mm Multi Grenade Launcher System (MGL)

Most of the  equipment for the Cobra is manufactured indigenously by the Indian Ordnance Factories controlled by the Ordnance Factories Board, Ministry of Defence, Government of India.

Some weapon like long-range sniper rifles are imported from overseas

Training
CoBRA's are trained in the CRPF jungle warfare institutions in Belgaum and Koraput. Their training regime and duration is along the lines of other commando forces of the country such as the National Security Guard. They are trained to adapt themselves in the art of camouflage and jungle warfare with the main focus being on guerilla and jungle warfare . All personnel are trained for helicopter borne insertion and drops. Refresher courses are conducted annually and bi-annually to ensure that the unit and its personnel function as a well-oiled machine without any hijinks. Their role is to carry out reconnaissance and long range patrols, gather intelligence on the whereabouts of the insurgents, and also carry out ambushes and precision strikes when required.

After three months of training in Belgaum or Koraput, CoBRA members are deployed to their respective units to counter-Naxal activities.

Major operations
 On 05-6 March 2018 an operation "चक्रव्यूह" was conducted in Vill-Akbaitanr, U/PS-Dumari, Distt-Giridih (Jharkhand) by "Alpha coy" of 203 Cobra Battalion in which 03 hardcore and 35 lakhs rewardee Maoists and 12 Dasta Members were apprehended along with recovery of a huge cache of arms and ammunition. It was one of the historical operations in the history of Indian Paramilitary forces as the Cobra Commandos   captured all those hardcore Maoists without firing a single bullet. Team Alfa of 203 cobra recovered 15 weapons with much ammunition, IEDs, Maoist literature, laptops and mobiles etc. 
 On 17 September 2009 an operation was conducted in Singamdgu Dantewada district in which approximately 30–40 Maoists were reported to be killed.
 On 9 January 2010 under PS Jagargunda in district. Dantewada, 4 Maoists were killed and 112 Bore Gun with 4 cartridges, 3 muzzle-loading guns, 2 Tiffin Bomb, 1 improvised explosive device, Drum and Maoists literature with photographs were recovered.
 Ops Jaws carried out by 08 teams of 203 CoBRA from 11 TO 15 June in area of PS Sonua & Bandgaon District.- W/ Singhbhum, Jharkhand in which a Maoists camp was destroyed and reportedly 12 Maoists cadres were killed.
 During an operation launched in Duli forest area in W/Midnapur district (West Bengal) on 15–16 June 2010, 8 Maoists cadres were killed and a huge cache of arms and ammunitions was recovered.
 During an operation launched in Kayma forest area in W/Midnapur District. (WB) from 25–26 July 2010, 6 Maoists cadres were killed and a huge cache of arms and ammunitions were recovered.
 In operation launched in Saranda forest area in District. –  W/Singhbhum, Jharkhand from 24–28 September 2010 Cobra teams were able to penetrate deep in forest and kill one Maoist, apprehend 4 Maoists cadres, bust 12 Maoist camps and recover of arms, ammunitions and explosives.

References

External links

Paramilitary forces of India
Naxalite–Maoist insurgency
Year of establishment missing
Non-military counterinsurgency organizations
Specialist law enforcement agencies of India
2008 establishments in India